Ana María González Tardos (31 August 1918 – 18 June 1983) was a Mexican singer, famous throughout Ibero-America and Spain for her recordings and performances.

References

External links
 

Mexican voice actresses
1918 births
1983 deaths
Bolero singers
Ranchera singers
Singers from Veracruz
20th-century Mexican women singers